The IX Army Corps was a corps of the Royal Italian Army between 1877 and 1944.

History 
the IX Army Corps participated in World War I. 

In 1940, the IX Corps was assigned to defend the south-eastern coast between Pescara and Lecce. The headquarters were located in Putignano in the province of Bari. 
The Corps remained here for the duration of the war, and after the Armistice of Cassibile on 8 September 1943, the Corps moved to Brindisi in Puglia to escape capture by the Germans. 
On 15 September 1943, it was renamed LI Army Corps to fight alongside the Allies, but this never came into effect. 

1944 - On 1 July 1944, it assumed the name of Military Command of Puglia and Lucania, with airport defense tasks around the harbours of Taranto and Brindisi.

Composition (1940-1943) 

47th Infantry Division "Bari" (June 1941 - September 1942)
152nd Infantry Division "Piceno" (1942-1943)
58th Infantry Division "Legnano" (1943)
209th Coastal Division (1943-1945) 
210th Coastal Division (1943-1945)

Commanders 
 Luigi Segato (1915.06.20 - 1915.10.29)
 Emilio De Bono (1918.03 – 1919.01)
 Quirino Armellini (1942.08.05 – 1943.07.29)
 Roberto Lerici (1943.07.30 – 1943.09.08)
 Gen. C. Ismaele Di Nisio

References 
 

Army corps of Italy in World War II